Šegrt is a Serbo-Croatian surname, derived from the word šegrt ("apprentice"), itself originating from Ottoman Turkish şâgird. It is borne by ethnic Serbs and Croats. It may refer to:

Mirjana Šegrt (born 1950), retired Yugoslav freestyle and butterfly swimmer from Croatia
Vlado Šegrt, SRBiH President of the Presidium of the People's Assembly (September 1948 - March 1953)
Petar Segrt, Croatian-born German football coach
Rade Šegrt, Bosnian Serb author
Miloš Šegrt, Bosnian Serb guslar

See also
Lapitch the Little Shoemaker (Čudnovate zgode šegrta Hlapića), Croatian animated film

Serbian surnames
Croatian surnames